Sultan Abdul Aziz al-Mutasim Billah Shah ibni Almarhum Raja Muda Musa  (عبد العزيز بيراك, 14 November 1887 – 26 March 1948) was the 31st Sultan of Perak, a state in the British-administered Federated Malay States.

Early life
Raja Abdul Aziz was born on 14 November 1887 at Kampung Bandar,
Teluk Anson, Perak. He was the son of Raja Muda Musa ibni Almarhum Sultan Ja’afar Safiuddin Mu’azzam Shah Waliullah.

Sultan of Perak
On 1 August 1918, he was appointed Raja Bendahara and four months later on 18 December 1918, he was appointed Raja Muda (Crown Prince) upon the passing of Sultan Abdul Jalil and resided in Teluk Anson, the place where he was born. Became the Raja Muda of Perak in 1919 during the reign of his brother-in-law, Sultan Iskandar Shah Ibni Almarhum Sultan Idris Murshidul Adzam Shah Rahmatullah. He became the 31st Sultan of Perak in 1938 succeeding Sultan Iskandar Shah.

Death

In 1948, he began to show poor health and was advised by his doctors to go to Lumut for a change of air. However, he died suddenly at the Lumut Rest House on 26 March 1948. Almarhum was interred at the Al-Ghufran Royal Mausoleum in Bukit Chandan and the posthumous title Marhum Nikmatullah was conferred upon him and was 60 years old when he died. He was succeeded by his cousin, Sultan Yussuff Izzuddin Shah Ibni Almarhum Sultan Abdul Jalil Karamatullah Nasiruddin Mukhtaram Shah Radziallah.

Honours

British Honours 
 Companion of the Most Distinguished Order of Saint Michael and Saint George (3 June 1924). 
 Knight Grand Cordon of the Order of the Crown of Thailand (20 October 1924).
 King George V Silver Jubilee Medal (6 May 1935).
 Knight Commander of the Most Excellent Order of the British Empire (3 May 1937).
 King George VI Coronation Medal (12 May 1937)
 Knight Commander of the Most Distinguished Order of Saint Michael and Saint George (1 January 1939).

Ancestry

References

External links
 List of Perak Sultans 

1887 births
1948 deaths
Sultans of Perak
Honorary Knights Commander of the Order of St Michael and St George
Honorary Knights Commander of the Order of the British Empire